Beata Jankowska-Tzimas (born 1 May 1970 in Gołdap) is a Polish singer and actress. In 2013, she became a contestant on The Voice of Poland.

Polish dubbing 
 2008:The Secret Saturdays – Drew Saturday
 2008:The Little Mermaid: Ariel's Beginning- Ariel
 2005:Dive, Olly Dive!- Olly
 2005–2008:Ben 10--
 Pinky  (odc. 29) 
 Kai  (odc. 31) 
 2005:The New House- Koko
 2005:Barbie and the Magic of Pegasus- Troll / Wife No. 3
 2004:The Backyardigans- Pablo
 2004:The Terminal
 2004:Transformers: War of Energon- Mika
 2003:Little Robots- Tiny
 2003:Children with Ms. Solar Valley
 2003–2005:The Teen Titans- Terra
 2003:The Jungle Book 2
 2000:Rugrats in the Paris
 2000:The Little Mermaid 2: Return to the Sea- Ariel
 1998–2004:The Powerpuff Girls- Blossom
 1998:Prince of Egypt- Miriam
 1998:Rudolph the Red-Nosed Reindeer- Morning Star (voice)
 1997–1998:Saban's Adventures of Oliver Twist
 1996:Little Mouse on the Prairie- Spryciulka
 1997:World of Peter Rabbit and His Friends- Singing songs
 1996:The Why Why Family- Kwik
 1994:Tonde Burin
 1994:Swan Princess (TV version)- Odette
 1990:Pinocchio
 1989:Little Mermaid- Ariel
 1987:Yogi Bear and the Magical Flight of the Spruce Goose- Singing songs
 1984–1991:Muppet Babies- Skeeter
 1983–1987:Fraglesy
 1983:Donald Duck presents
 1960–1966:The Flintstones

 Films series, and Scooby-Doo – as Daphne
 2007:Chill Out, Scooby-Doo!
 2005:Scooby-Doo on the trail Mumii
 2005:Aloha, Scooby-Doo!
 2004:Scooby-Doo! and the Loch Ness Monster
 2003:Scooby-Doo and Mexican monster
 2003:Scooby-Doo and the Legend Wampira
 2001:Scooby-Doo and Cyber Chase
 2000:Scooby-Doo and
 1999:Scooby-Doo and the Spirit of magicians
 1998:Scooby-Doo on Zombie Island
 1979:Scooby-Doo conquer Hollywood
 2006:Kudłaty and Scooby-Doo to the trail
 2002–2005:What's new in Scooby'ego ?
 1988–1991:A Pup Named Scooby-Doo
 1985:13 demons Scooby-Doo
 1979–1984:Scooby-Doo and Scrappy
 1976–1978:Scooby-Doo
 1972–1973:New Scooby-Doo
 1969–1970:Scooby-Doo, Where Are You!

References

1970 births
Living people
Polish voice actresses
21st-century Polish singers
21st-century Polish women singers
People from Gołdap